Alan John Miller (29 March 1970 – 3 June 2021) was an English professional footballer who played as a goalkeeper.

He notably played in the Premier League for Arsenal, Middlesbrough and Blackburn Rovers,  however his 108 league appearances for West Bromwich Albion over two spells was the club he appeared the most for. During his playing career he also played in the Football League for Plymouth Argyle, Birmingham City, Huddersfield Town, Grimsby Town, Bristol City and Coventry City, as well as a spell in the Scottish Premier League with St Johnstone. He was capped 4 times by England U21

Life and career 
Miller grew up at Loughton, where he attended Epping Forest High School. He began his footballing career as an apprentice at Arsenal in 1984. With them he won the FA Youth Cup in 1988, and won four caps for the England under-21 team. However, with John Lukic and then David Seaman, first-team opportunities were rare. He had loan spells with Plymouth Argyle, West Bromwich Albion and Birmingham City.

He finally made his Arsenal debut on 21 November 1992 as a substitute, the first ever Arsenal goalkeeper to come on as a sub. He made another seven appearances over the next two seasons. He won FA Cup and League Cup winners' medals in 1992–93 and a European Cup Winners' Cup medal in 1993–94, as an unused substitute each time.

In summer 1994, wanting first team football, Miller moved to Middlesbrough for £500,000, winning a First Division winners' medal in his first season.

In 1997, he signed for West Bromwich Albion in a £400,000 deal, before moving on to Blackburn Rovers in 2000. He played only two games during his time at Ewood Park, against Sheffield United in the league and Portsmouth in the League Cup. While at Blackburn, he went on loan to Bristol City and Coventry City during 2000–01. His only appearance at Coventry was one to forget, as he came on as a substitute against Chelsea after Chris Kirkland was sent off. Coventry lost 6–1. In October 2001, he was loaned out again, this time to St Johnstone. He was recalled from his loan spell at St Johnstone to take his place on the bench as Blackburn won the 2002 Football League Cup Final, providing back-up to Brad Friedel, because of injury to the regular second-choice goalkeeper Alan Kelly. Miller retired in 2003 after failing to overcome a back injury.

Personal life
He lived in Holkham and played cricket for the Holkham Estate. He died on 3 June 2021, aged 51.

Honours

Club
Arsenal
FA Youth Cup: 1988
FA Charity Shield: 1991 (shared)
FA Cup: 1993
League Cup: 1993
European Cup Winners Cup: 1994

Middlesbrough
First Division: 1995

Blackburn Rovers
League Cup: 2002

Individual
First Division PFA Team of the Year: 1997–98

References

External links

1970 births
2021 deaths
People from Epping
People from Holkham
English footballers
Association football goalkeepers
Premier League players
Scottish Premier League players
Arsenal F.C. players
Plymouth Argyle F.C. players
West Bromwich Albion F.C. players
Birmingham City F.C. players
Middlesbrough F.C. players
Huddersfield Town A.F.C. players
Grimsby Town F.C. players
Blackburn Rovers F.C. players
Bristol City F.C. players
Coventry City F.C. players
St Johnstone F.C. players
England under-21 international footballers
Portsmouth F.C. non-playing staff